Dieter Schatzschneider (born 26 April 1958) is a German former footballer who formerly held the record for the highest number of 2. Bundesliga goals (154). He is well-known mostly for being associated with Hannover 96, for whom he is also their record goalscorer.

He played in the 1984 Olympics for the West Germany football team.

After retiring from playing, he coached as various clubs including Emden, Sportfreunde Ricklingen, Arminia Hannover and SVG Göttingen 07.

Notes

References

External links
 

1958 births
Living people
Footballers from Hanover
German footballers
Association football forwards
Germany under-21 international footballers
Olympic footballers of West Germany
West German footballers
Footballers at the 1984 Summer Olympics
Bundesliga players
2. Bundesliga players
Austrian Football Bundesliga players
Hannoverscher SC players
Hannover 96 players
SC Fortuna Köln players
Hamburger SV players
FC Schalke 04 players
FC Augsburg players
Grazer AK players
FC Augsburg managers
Altonaer FC von 1893 managers
German football managers
German expatriate footballers
German expatriate sportspeople in Austria
Expatriate footballers in Austria